SRES is a four letter acronym that may refer to:

 Seniors Real Estate Specialist, a real estate professional designation
 Special Report on Emissions Scenarios, a global climate change report
 the School for Resource and Environmental Studies at Dalhousie University